Louis-Alexandre de La Rochefoucauld (4 July 1743, Paris - 4 September 1792, Gisors, Normandy) was a French nobleman and politician. He was a member of the House of La Rochefoucauld (one of the oldest and most famous French noble families, originating in La Roche in the 10th-11th centuries) and a major lord under the Ancien Régime. He also played a political role in 1789 early on in the French Revolution before being executed in the September Massacres. He was a duke, initially with the title 'duc d'Enville' or 'duc d'Anville' and later with that of 6th duc de La Rochefoucauld. He was a cousin to François Alexandre Frédéric de La Rochefoucauld-Liancourt and Ambroise-Polycarpe de La Rochefoucauld-Doudeauville.

Life
He was a son of Jean-Baptiste de La Rochefoucauld de Roye (killed in the 1746 Duc d'Anville expedition) and  Marie-Louise-Nicole de La Rochefoucauld. In 1762,he married Louise-Pauline de Gand de Mérode, but they had no children. That same year he inherited the title of duc de La Rochefoucauld on the death of his grandfather Alexandre de La Rochefoucauld (29 September 1690 - 1762). His second marriage was in 1780 to his niece Alexandrine Charlotte de Rohan-Chabot - this marriage was also without issue.

He was one of the keenest French defenders of the American Revolution, befriending and translating for Benjamin Franklin - in Paris in 1783 he and Franklin published Constitutions des Treize États-Unis de l'Amérique (Constitutions of 13 United States of America). He was also passionate about natural sciences and travelled to England, Sweden (where he became a member of the Royal Swedish Academy of Sciences), Germany, Switzerland, Italy and Savoy. His friends also included Desmarest, Dolomieu, Saussure, Turgot, Condorcet. He served as president of the Société royale de médecine and the Académie royale des sciences. In 1786, he was elected to the American Philosophical Society.

He was elected as a deputy to the Estates General of 1789 and was one of the 47 deputies from the nobility who joined forces with the Third Estate on 25 June 1789. He proposed article XI of the 1789 Declaration - that article was adopted. Worried by the turn of events, he became a member of his department's directory after the Constituent Assembly split. Early July he opposed Pétion and Louis Pierre Manuel and after the events of 10th August 1792 he resigned and left Paris to escape the people's anger. He was arrested at Gisors whilst escorting his wife and mother from Forges to the château de La Roche-Guyon, accompanied by Dolomieu. He was killed on 4 September 1792 by volunteer troops from Sarthe and Orne who were hunting aristocrats whilst en route to fight the Prussians, who were aiming to capture Verdun. The city authorities and Dolomieu tried in vain to save him.

References

Bibliography (in French)
 Jules Michelet, Révolution française 
 Daniel Vaugelade, [https://books.google.com/books?id=bOtNHibP5NsC Le Salon physiocratique des La Rochefoucauld, Publibook, 2001
 Daniel Vaugelade, La Question américaine au XVIIIe siecle à travers la correspondance du duc Louis Alexandre de La Rochefoucauld, Publibook, 2005
 Solange Fasquelle, Les La Rochefoucauld : une famille dans l'Histoire de France, Perrin, 

People of the Ancien Régime
Members of the French Academy of Sciences
People executed during the French Revolution
French people of the American Revolution
1743 births
1792 deaths
Members of the American Philosophical Society
Dukes of La Rochefoucauld